Markis Kido (11 August 1984 – 14 June 2021) was an Indonesian badminton player and one of the world's leading in men's doubles discipline. He won the discipline's gold medal at the 2006 World Cup, 2007 World Championships, 2008 Olympic Games, 2009 Asia Championships, and 2010 Asian Games with Hendra Setiawan.

Career 
In 2005, with Hendra Setiawan, he won the Asian Badminton Championships and the Indonesia Open. In 2006, the pair also won the Jakarta Satellite, the Hong Kong Open and the China Open after defeating Cai Yun and Fu Haifeng 21–16, 21–16 at the finals.

In 2007, Kido and Setiawan became World Champions after defeating Jung Jae-sung and Lee Yong-dae from South Korea, 21–19 and 21–19, at the World Championships finals in Kuala Lumpur, Malaysia. 2007 was a very big year for them. They also won the China Super Series after beating China's Guo Zhendong and Xie Zhongbo 21–12, 21–19 in the finals, and the World Cup after defeating Malaysia's Lin Woon Fui and Mohd Fairuzizuan Mohd Tazari 21–18, 21–15 in the finals at Yiyang, Hunan. They were runners-up at the China Masters Super Series, losing the final to China's Cai Yun and Fu Haifeng, 15–21, 16–21. In September, they won the Chinese Taipei Grand Prix Gold event. In December 2007, they won the Hong Kong Super Series, defeating the famous veterans Tony Gunawan and Candra Wijaya 21–12, 18–21, 21–13 in the finals. At the 2007 Southeast Asian Games in Thailand, they helped the Indonesian team win the gold medal in the men's team event, and won gold in men's doubles at the individual event after beating the Indonesian born pair Hendri Kurniawan Saputra and Hendra Wijaya who represented Singapore, 21–17 and 21–12.

In January 2008, they won the Malaysian Super Series. Later that year they teamed to capture their most prestigious prize, the Olympic gold medal in men's doubles at the 2008 Summer Olympics held in Beijing, China. They defeated the Chinese pair of Cai Yun and Fu Haifeng 12–21, 21–11, 21–16 in a thrilling match which more than avenged their loss to the same pair at the China Masters the previous summer.

In September 2008, they took the 2008 China Masters Super Series after beating China's Sun Junjie and Xu Chen in straight sets in the final round. In October 2008, Kido and Setiawan teamed to win the Denmark Super Series after beating China's Fu Haifeng and Shen Ye 21–18, 21–19 in the finals. They captured the French Super Series in early November 2008 after beating yet another Chinese pairing, Cai Yun and Xu Chen, in the final round.

In September 2009, Kido and Setiawan won the Japan Super Series after beating another Indonesian pair, Yonatan Suryatama Dasuki and Rian Sukmawan 21–19 and 24–22 in the final round. In October 2009, they won the French Super Series. On 17 December 2009, they defeated Malaysian duo Koo Kien Keat and Tan Boon Heong to win gold at the 2009 Southeast Asian Games in Vientiane, Laos.

They continued their domination to win the gold medal at the 2010 Asian Games in Guangzhou after beating Koo Kien Keat and Tan Boon Heong. They won all their round matches of the competition in 3 games as well.

Participation in Indonesian national team 
 Three times at Thomas Cup (2006, 2008, 2010)
 Two times at Sudirman Cup (2007, 2009)

Personal life 
Kido started playing badminton in Jaya Raya Jakarta badminton club. His parents are Djumharbey Anwar (father) and Yul Asteria Zakaria (mother). In his spare time he played football. His brother, Bona Septano, and sister, Pia Zebadiah Bernadet, are also Indonesian national badminton players.

On 14 June 2021, Kido died from an apparent heart attack during a badminton friendly match.

Achievements

Olympic Games 
Men's doubles

BWF World Championships 
Men's doubles

World Cup 
Men's doubles

Asian Games 
Men's doubles

Asian Championships 
Men's doubles

Southeast Asian Games 
Men's doubles

World Junior Championships 
Boys' doubles

Mixed doubles

Asian Junior Championships 
Boys' doubles

Mixed doubles

BWF Superseries (10 titles, 5 runners-up) 
The BWF Superseries, which was launched on 14 December 2006 and implemented in 2007, is a series of elite badminton tournaments, sanctioned by the Badminton World Federation (BWF). BWF Superseries levels are Superseries and Superseries Premier. A season of Superseries consists of twelve tournaments around the world that have been introduced since 2011. Successful players are invited to the Superseries Finals, which are held at the end of each year.

Men's doubles

 BWF Superseries Finals tournament
  BWF Superseries Premier tournament
 BWF Superseries tournament

BWF Grand Prix (10 titles, 3 runners-up) 
The BWF Grand Prix had two levels, the BWF Grand Prix and Grand Prix Gold. It was a series of badminton tournaments sanctioned by the Badminton World Federation (BWF) which was held from 2007 to 2017. The World Badminton Grand Prix was sanctioned by International Badminton Federation (IBF) from 1983 to 2006.

Men's doubles

Mixed doubles

  BWF Grand Prix Gold tournament
  BWF & IBF Grand Prix tournament

BWF International Challenge/Series (1 runner-up) 
Men's doubles

  BWF International Challenge tournament
  BWF International Series tournament

Performance timeline

National team 
 Junior level

 Senior level

Individual competitions 
 Junior level

 Senior level

Record against selected opponents 
Men's doubles results with Marcus Fernaldi Gideon against World Superseries finalists, World Superseries Finals semifinalists, World Championships semifinalists, and Olympic quarterfinalists.

  Chai Biao & Hong Wei 0–2
  Qiu Zihan & Liu Xiaolong 1–2
  Zhang Nan & Fu Haifeng 1–0
  Mads Pieler Kolding & Mads Conrad-Petersen 0–2
  Mathias Boe & Carsten Mogensen 1–1
  Muhammad Ahsan & Hendra Setiawan 0–3
  Hiroyuki Endo & Kenichi Hayakawa 1–0
  Ko Sung-hyun & Shin Baek-cheol 2–1
  Lee Yong-dae & Yoo Yeon-seong 0–1
  Goh V Shem & Lim Khim Wah 0–1
  Tan Boon Heong & Koo Kien Keat 1–0
  Tan Wee Kiong & Hoon Thien How 1–0

Men's doubles results with Hendra Setiawan against World Superseries finalists, World Superseries Finals semifinalists, World Championships semifinalists, and Olympic quarterfinalists.

  Cai Yun & Xu Chen 2–0
  Chai Biao & Guo Zhendong 1–1
  Chai Biao & Zhang Nan 1–0
  Fu Haifeng & Cai Yun 3–6
  Fu Haifeng & Shen Ye 1–0
  Guo Zhendong & Xie Zhongbo 3–0
  Guo Zhendong & Xu Chen 2–0
  Hong Wei & Shen Ye 0–2
  Sang Yang & Zheng Bo 0–1
  Sun Junjie & Xu Chen 2–0
  Fang Chieh-min & Lee Sheng-mu 7–4
  Jens Eriksen & Martin Lundgaard Hansen 4–1
  Lars Paaske & Jonas Rasmussen 7–5
  Mathias Boe & Carsten Mogensen 1–5
  Anthony Clark & Nathan Robertson 1–1
  Anthony Clark &  Robert Blair 0–2
  Johannes Schöttler & Ingo Kindervater 0–1
  Angga Pratama & Rian Agung Saputro 2–0
  Bona Septano & Muhammad Ahsan 1–1
  Candra Wijaya & Sigit Budiarto 1–0
  Candra Wijaya &  Tony Gunawan 4–3
  Eng Hian & Flandy Limpele 1–2
  Hendra Aprida Gunawan & Alvent Yulianto 4–3
  Luluk Hadiyanto & Alvent Yulianto 2–3
  Rian Sukmawan & Yonathan Suryatama Dasuki 3–1
  Hirokatsu Hashimoto & Noriyasu Hirata 3–2
  Kenichi Hayakawa & Hiroyuki Endo 3–1
  Keita Masuda & Tadashi Ōtsuka 5–1
  Shintaro Ikeda & Shuichi Sakamoto 1–0
  Jung Jae-sung & Lee Yong-dae 5–7
  Kim Dong-moon & Ha Tae-kwon 0–1
  Kim Gi-jung & Kim Sa-rang 0–1
  Ko Sung-hyun & Lee Yong-dae 1–0
  Ko Sung-hyun & Yoo Yeon-seong 3–2
  Lee Jae-jin & Hwang Ji-man 1–0
  Shin Baek-cheol & Cho Gun-woo 1–0
  Chan Chong Ming & Chew Choon Eng 1–0
  Chan Chong Ming & Koo Kien Keat 1–0
  Choong Tan Fook & Lee Wan Wah 6–2
  Gan Teik Chai & Lin Woon Fui 2–0
  Goh V Shem & Lim Khim Wah 1–0
  Hoon Thien How & Tan Wee Kiong 1–0
  Koo Kien Keat & Tan Boon Heong 4–6
  Mohd Zakry Abdul Latif & Mohd Fairuzizuan Mohd Tazari 7–0
  Robert Mateusiak & Michał Łogosz 3–0
  Howard Bach & Khan Malaythong 1–0
  Howard Bach & Tony Gunawan '''2–1

References

External links 
 
 

1984 births
2021 deaths
Sportspeople from Jakarta
Indonesian male badminton players
Badminton players at the 2008 Summer Olympics
Olympic badminton players of Indonesia
Olympic gold medalists for Indonesia
Olympic medalists in badminton
Medalists at the 2008 Summer Olympics
Badminton players at the 2006 Asian Games
Badminton players at the 2010 Asian Games
Asian Games gold medalists for Indonesia
Asian Games bronze medalists for Indonesia
Asian Games medalists in badminton
Medalists at the 2006 Asian Games
Medalists at the 2010 Asian Games
Competitors at the 2003 Southeast Asian Games
Competitors at the 2005 Southeast Asian Games
Competitors at the 2007 Southeast Asian Games
Competitors at the 2009 Southeast Asian Games
Competitors at the 2011 Southeast Asian Games
Southeast Asian Games gold medalists for Indonesia
Southeast Asian Games silver medalists for Indonesia
Southeast Asian Games medalists in badminton
World No. 1 badminton players
Sport deaths in Indonesia
21st-century Indonesian people